Culver City station is an elevated light rail station on the E Line of the Los Angeles Metro Rail system. The station is located on a dedicated right-of-way alongside Exposition Boulevard — between the intersection of Venice Boulevard and Robertson Boulevard on the west and the intersection of Washington Boulevard and National Boulevard on the east. The station is located in the city of Culver City, California, after which the station is named. The station served as the western terminus of the line from its opening on June 20, 2012, until the opening of the extension of the line to Santa Monica on May 20, 2016.

History 
A railway stop known as La Ballona Station, along the Los Angeles and Independence Railway established 1874, was located on or near the site of what came to be known as Ivy Station, Culver Junction and Culver City station. La Ballona Station was located at what is now Washington Boulevard, which circa 1883 was known as the "Monte Vista and La Ballona Station Road" and which extended Washington Street west from Los Angeles. In 1886, the "surveyors of the Santa Monica Railroad have just crossed the S.P. track at Ballona, just where the county road crossed that track near La Ballona station. The terminus is finally fixed at South Santa Monica, near where the old Juan Bernard wharf is." When the Palms Depot opened in 1887 it was noted to be between La Ballona Station and Santa Monica. The name La Ballona Station was still in use as late as 1893; the name Ivy Station first appears in print in 1889. 

Los Angeles-Pacific Railroad built the Venice Short Line though the area in 1903. The interurban railway was grade-separated from the steam railroad via an underpass. When The LAP began running cars over the Santa Monica Air Line in 1908, the tracks were connected to allow interchanges. The point was later renamed Culver Junction to reflect its new role.

The Venice line closed in September 1950, making it no longer a junction; finally, all passenger service ended on September 30, 1953. The name "Culver Junction" remained on maps, referring to the immediate surrounding area. With service restoration along the corridor in June 2012, the new light rail station was named Culver City.

Ivy Substation, a traction substation building which housed mechanical rotary converters used to supply DC current to the line until 1953, is still standing near this station and has been converted into the popular Actor's Gang Theater. (Train power now comes from a much smaller building beneath the elevated platform.)

Service

Station layout

Hours and frequency 
E Line trains run every day between approximately 4:30 a.m. and 12:30 am. Trains operate every ten minutes during peak hours Monday through Friday, every twelve minutes during the daytime on weekdays and all day on the weekends after approximately 8 a.m. (with 15 to 20-minute headways early Saturday and Sunday mornings). Night service is every 20 minutes.

Connections 
, the following connections are available:
 Big Blue Bus (Santa Monica): Rapid 12
 Culver CityBus: 1
 LADOT Commuter Express: 
 Los Angeles Metro Bus: ,

Notable places nearby 

At the northeast edge of Downtown Culver City, a major retail, entertainment and arts district, the station is within walking distance of several notable places:
 Helms Bakery
 Ballona Creek Bike Path
Hayden Tract
Museum of Jurassic Technology
Kirk Douglas Theater
Ivy Substation (a former power building for this station)
Ivy Station (apartments, retail, a hotel, and the west coast headquarters of HBO)

Station artwork 
The station's art was created by artist Tom LaDuke. Entitled Unknowable Origins, the installation depicts softly rendered views of Culver City as seen from surrounding hillside viewpoints, with abstracted face shapes of notable people from Culver City appearing in each panel.

Additional images

References 

Electric Railway Historical Association of Southern California, Pacific Electric, accessed January 2008
Electric Railway Historical Association of Southern California, A Chronology of Changes in Rail Passenger Operations of the Pacific Electric Railway Company, accessed January 2008
Line names mostly come from the McGraw Transit Directory, 1920, p. 11.

External links

E Line (Los Angeles Metro) stations
Buildings and structures in Culver City, California
Railway stations in the United States opened in 2012
2012 establishments in California
Pacific Electric stations
History of Culver City, California
Transportation in Culver City, California